The 2012 Kilkenny Intermediate Hurling Championship was the 48th staging of the Kilkenny Intermediate Hurling Championship since its establishment by the Kilkenny County Board in 1929. The Championship began on 13 October 2012 and ended on 18 November 2012.

On 18 November 2012, Clara won the championship after a 1–07 to 0–04 victory over St. Patrick's Ballyragget in the final at Nowlan Park. It was their fourth title overall and their first title since 2007.

St. Patrick's Ballyragget's Kevin Kelly was the championship's top scorer with 1-29.

Team changes

To Championship

Promoted from the Kilkenny Junior Hurling Championship
 St Patrick's Ballyragget

Relegated from the Kilkenny Senior Hurling Championship
 Clara

From Championship

Promoted to the Kilkenny Senior Hurling Championship
 Danesfort

Relegated to the Kilkenny Junior Hurling Championship
 Graignamanagh

Results

First round

Relegation play-off

Quarter-finals

Semi-finals

Final

Championship statistics

Top scorers

Top scorers overall

Top scorers in a single game

References

Kilkenny Intermediate Hurling Championship
Kilkenny Intermediate Hurling Championship